Duschek is a German surname, a Germanized version of the Czech surname Dušek. Notable people with the surname include:

Ferenc Duschek (1797–1872), Hungarian politician
Franz Xaver Duschek (1731–1799), Czech composer
Harald Duschek (born 1956), German former ski jumper
Josepha Duschek (1754–1824), Czech opera singer

German-language surnames
Surnames of Czech origin